The 2010 Texas Bowl was the fifth edition of the college football bowl game, and was played at Reliant Stadium in Houston, Texas. The game started at 5:00 PM US CST on Wednesday, December 29, 2010. The game was telecast on ESPN for the second time in bowl history after being televised by the NFL Network for the first three games.  The bowl matched the sixth selection from the Big 12 Conference, Baylor, versus the sixth selection from the Big Ten Conference, Illinois.

Pre-game

By December 8, three days after the announcement of the participating teams, approximately 60,000 of the stadium's 70,000 seats had been purchased; bowl officials anticipated the bowl's first-ever sellout. Baylor announced the same day that all but 400 of its 12,000-ticket allotment had been sold and that the athletics department had requested more tickets from the Texas Bowl.

Teams

Illinois

After a disappointing 7-6 season Illinois returns to a bowl game to face Baylor.  Illinois boasts Mikel Leshoure who emerged as the Big Ten's best running back this season, ranking eighth nationally in rushing with 126.1 yards per game.  Illinois has not won a bowl game since 1999 when they defeated Virginia in the MicronPC.com Bowl.  The game will also mark the Fighting Illini's first appearance in the Texas Bowl.

Baylor

Baylor enters the Texas Bowl with a 7-5 record.  After a 7-2 start the Bears lost their last 3 contests.  Baylor boasts 5 receivers with at least 40 catches in their high-powered offense.  The Bears will be playing in their first Texas Bowl.  This is their first bowl appearance since the 1994 Alamo Bowl where they lost to the high powered Washington State Cougars.

Game Summary

Scoring

Statistics

Notes
This was the second time that the two programs have met in a game.  Baylor was a 34-19 winner over Illinois in their only previous meeting at Champaign, Illinois on September 25, 1976.

References

External links
 Game summary at ESPN

Texas Bowl
Texas Bowl
Baylor Bears football bowl games
Illinois Fighting Illini football bowl games
Texas Bowl
Texas Bowl
Texas Bowl